The Long Point–Eureka Heights fault system is a system of geologic faults in Houston, Texas.  It runs beneath the metropolitan area from the southwest to the northeast.  The various faults are characterized as normal faults, meaning that the downthrown side is in the direction of the dip of the fault plane.  This fault system as well as others located in nearby parts of Texas are believed to have formed millions of years ago during the formation of the Gulf of Mexico.  No significant earthquakes have occurred on these faults in historic times, but slow movement has been observed.

Gallery

References

Houston: On Shaky Ground
 University of Houston fault map
Fault Map (Google)

Geology of Texas
Seismic faults of the United States